Holy Angels' I.S.C School, Trivandrum, India, founded in 1971, is a private convent school for girls.The school offers the ISC and ICSE syllabi from Kindergarten to Standard twelve. Sr. Pramila is the principal of the school.

History
Holy Angels’ Convent High School was founded by the Congregation of the Carmelite Religious in 1880 with the express purpose of education and empowering the girl child. The Congregation branched out and established many educational institutions in different streams.

Holy Angels’ ISC School is an all-girls school in Trivandrum. Established in 1971 by the Congregation of the Carmelite Religious, the school endeavours to provide quality education in keeping with the national aspirations. Along with academic excellence, the school imprints an indelible mark of moral values on all students that pass out of its portals. An overall development of personality makes each Holy Angels’ student a worthwhile, useful and active citizen of India.

The first batch of ISC Students passed out from the school in 1975, and the first ICSE batch in 1976. With the shifting of the High School and the twelfth standard classes to Nanthencode, Holy Angels’ ISC School became an independent institution.

About the institution

The Uniform
 Std. I - V, the uniform comprises blue checked pinafore, with a white crest, white blouse, and blue checked tie.
 Std. VI - X, the uniform entails blue checked pleated skirt with white blouse, blue checked overcoat and royal blue tie with the school crest.
 Std. XI - XII, the uniform consists of navy blue pants and top.
 P.T uniforms and white shoes are worn on Wednesdays. The uniform is white T-shirt with skirts, sleeves and socks with stripes corresponding to house colours.
 Students of all classes also have school shoes and appropriate white socks added to their school attire.

House Prefect

The school follows a house system which consists of four houses:
Ruby
Sapphire
Emerald
Topaz
Each house is headed by a captain, along with a house mistress and an assistant.

The school leader, captains and assistants are appointed in the 11th grade by the Principal of the school. The election is based on several factors such as leadership qualities, impartiality and integrity.

The Faculty and Management 

The faculty comprises 70+ teachers educating students on the subjects of:
Language 
Mathematics
Science
Social Studies
Physical Education
Commercial Studies
Moral Science/Catechism

The management includes the Principal, the manager and the staff secretary of the institution.

Events

The school has a variety of different events ranging from interschool, intraschool, competitive and non-competitive. 
It's a chance for the students to demonstrate their abilities in a more creative way as well as to take a break from academics.
Chief Guests are usually present during these events along with the management, the faculty and the students.
Prize distribution or merit awards are optional.

Installation Ceremony

The installation ceremony, organised by the school every year in late June, is celebrated with great anticipation and pomp. The appointed school leaders assume their responsibilities of the following school year and vow to fulfill their duties wholeheartedly. The mistress of each house takes on the role of an overseer and it is considered to be a moment of pride for every student. The felicitation of the toppers for the previous academic year is also conducted along with the installation.

Youth Festival

The youth festival provides an opportunity for the students of the school to engage in cultural activities. It is a competitive event, held according to the house system, with one house emerging as the winner in the end. The school has a vast array of programs, from singing and dance to elocution and writing. There are both group as well as solo events. For every win, points are added to the respective houses till the last hour before calculation of the total results. The duration of the YF is 2 and a half/ three days.

Passing of Colours

Passing of colours is a solemn ceremony conducted to mark the graduation of each batch of students. Held in December, the event consists of the school leaders passing on their duties to their assistants followed by a candlelit prayer with the 12th grade students and their teachers. It is overall a very emotional event for not only the soon to be ex-Angelites but also the existing students of the school and the teachers. Speeches from the Principal, the school leader and the captains are also an important part of this.

Annual Day

The Annual Day is held at January of each year and is considered to be the most important and prestigious event of the institution. Usually held after 3 pm, extending into the night, it is a way for the students to express themselves through forms of art in the presence of the parents. Usually held on a big budget, it is a memorable day for all and highly anticipated.   

OLGA

OLGA stands for Old Girl's Association. It is a Facebook group.

Extracurricular activities

Extracurricular activities are performed by the students and these fall outside the realm of the normal curriculum of the school. These help to shape up the personality of a developing child as well as instilling values such as empathy, consistency and respect. The school provides ample opportunity for participation in a variety of events organised across the city. Music classes are provided for students.

Student Clubs

A considerable number of clubs are active in the institution. These are run by the student body, with the supervision of one or two teachers who act as the heads. Students can join any club they wish to from the ones given below:
Eco Club: This club is for the nature enthusiasts of the school. From taking care of the vegetation in the school campus to participating in competitions, the eco club is a highly active club that has regular meetings and proceedings.
Quiz Club: The most successful club in the history of the school, the Quiz club has bagged several awards and prizes in various competitions all over the city. 
Social Service Club: The social service club aims to spread awareness and the importance of helping the less privileged. Regular trips to orphanages, old age homes, shelters are all part of the regular workings of the club.

Karate

Karate classes are held every week to enable physical strength and agility in the students. An instructor is appointed to guide the students and to teach them the benefits of self defense. Uniforms are provided by the school within the first few classes.

Rollerskating

Rollerskating classes are another luxury enjoyed by the primary students of this institution. A skating tutor is arranged and all the students taking part in the class are thoroughly protected with knee pads, helmets, and elbow pads to make sure no injuries occur.

Sports

There are a wide range of sports offered by the school, some of them being badminton, table tennis and javelin. Appropriate equipment is also provided by the institution. The school is known for having won a large number of prestigious awards in different competitions through the years. Several students have made a name for themselves by winning laurels at state level competitions and have gone on to represent the school at national competitions

Notable alumni 
Ahaana Krishna

Aishwarya Lekshmi

External links
 School website

References

Carmelite educational institutions
Christian schools in Kerala
Girls' schools in Kerala
Primary schools in Kerala
High schools and secondary schools in Kerala
Private schools in Thiruvananthapuram